The 2014–15 Samford Bulldogs basketball team represented Samford University during the 2014–15 NCAA Division I men's basketball season. The Bulldogs, led by first year head coach Scott Padgett, played their home games at the Pete Hanna Center and were members of the Southern Conference. They finished the season 13–19, 6–12 in SoCon play to finish in a three way tie for seventh place. They lost in the first round of the SoContournament to UNC Greensboro.

Roster

Schedule

|-
!colspan=9 style="background:#ca1009; color:#14295e;"| Exhibition

|-
!colspan=9 style="background:#ca1009; color:#14295e;"| Regular season

|-
!colspan=9 style="background:#ca1009; color:#14295e;"| SoCon tournament

References

Samford Bulldogs men's basketball seasons
Samford
Samford
Samford